Kristiina Kolehmainen (21 November 1956, Kotka, Finland - 27 March 2012, Stockholm, Sweden) was a Finnish-Swedish librarian. She was head of Serieteket, the only special library for comics in Sweden, which she founded in 1996. She participated in and was responsible for a wide series of related events and activities, including the small exhibition which later grew into the Small Press Expo, and from 2012, the Stockholm International Comics Festival. Kolehmainen also worked as a translator, exhibition producer, and festival director.

Exhibitions

Festivals
1997-2012 - Producer and festival director for the Small Press Expo / Stockholm International Comics Festival, Stockholm
2001, 2003 - Producer for science fiction and fantasy festival Fantastika, summers

Translations
1997, 1998 - Translation of Charlie Christensen's Arne Anka to Finnish (Aarne Ankka 1-2)
1998 - Stripping in the Nordic countries, Finnish translation
2003 - Translation of Asa Branch Valls Seventh floor to Finnish (Seitsemäs kerros)
2007 - Translation of Amanda Vähämäkis Bull Field from Finnish into Swedish

References

1956 births
2012 deaths
People from Kotka
Finnish translators
Swedish librarians
Women librarians
Swedish translators
Festival directors
20th-century translators
Swedish people of Finnish descent
Organization founders
Women founders